The America West Hockey League (AWHL) was a Tier II Junior A ice hockey league. The AWHL was formed in 1992 to offer junior ice hockey to the Rocky Mountain region of USA Hockey. It originally was called the American Frontier Hockey League (AFHL), and the name change to AWHL came in 1998. The AWHL merged with the North American Hockey League in 2003 and after the merger, the NAHL name was kept.

In the Summer of 2011, a new league called the American West Hockey League was formed in the same region as the former AWHL operating as a Tier III league. The new AWHL featured 6 teams, including the former AWHL teams Billings Bulls, Bozeman Icedogs, Great Falls Americans, and Helena Bighorns. The new AWHL would later be merged into the North American 3 Hockey League as the Frontier Division.

Teams
Billings Bulls – (Billings, MT) 1993–2003; merged into NAHL 
Bismarck Bullets – (Bismarck, ND) 1993–94 
Bismarck Bobcats – (Bismarck, ND) 1997–2003; merged into NAHL 
Bozeman Icedogs – (Bozeman, MT) 1996–2003; merged into NAHL 
Butte Irish – (Butte, MT) 1996–2002; relocated to Wichita Falls as the Rustlers
Central Texas Blackhawks – (Belton, TX) 2002–03; merged into NAHL 
Central Wyoming Outlaws – (Casper, WY) 1993–98; known as Casper Outlaws from 1993–95 
Fairbanks Ice Dogs – (Fairbanks, AK) 2000–03; joined from NorPac; merged into NAHL 
Fernie Ghostriders – (Fernie, BC) 1999–2003; joined from KIJHL; merged into NAHL 
Great Falls Americans – (Great Falls, MT) 1994–2003; known as Kings Americans 1994–95 
Helena Bighorns – (Helena, MT) 2001–03; merged into NAHL 
Helena Gold Rush – (Helena, MT) 1994–2000; known as Helena Ice Pirates from 1994–99  
Jackson Hole Grizzlies – (Jackson, WY) 1993–97 
Kimberley Dynamiters – (Kimberley, BC) 1999–2001; joined from and later returned to KIJHL 
Minot Muskies – (Minot, ND) 2000–01 
Phoenix Polar Bears – (Chandler, AZ) 2002–03; a member of the Western States Hockey League used for 12 interleague games to fill out the South Division schedule
Pikes Peak Miners – (Colorado Springs, CO) 1993–94
Pueblo Venom – (Pueblo, CO) 1993–95; known as Pueblo Flames in 1993–94 
Tupelo T-Rex – (Tupelo, MS) 2001–03 
Vail Avalanche – (Vail, CO) 1993–96; relocated to Butte as the Irish
Wichita Falls Rustlers – (Wichita Falls, TX) 2002–03; merged into NAHL

Expansion

References

External links
 Info on the AWHL

Defunct junior ice hockey leagues in the United States
1992 establishments in the United States
Sports leagues established in 1992
Sports leagues disestablished in 2003
2003 disestablishments in the United States